A choral symphony is a large musical composition including an orchestra, a choir, and soloists.

Choral symphony may also refer to:

 Symphony No. 9 (Beethoven) or the "Choral" Symphony, 1824
 Choral Symphony (Dyson), a 1910 composition, rediscovered in 2014, by George Dyson
 Choral Symphony (Holst), a 1925 composition by Gustav Holst

See also
 List of choral symphonies
 :Category:Choral symphonies